The 1933 All-Ireland Senior Football Championship was the 47th staging of Ireland's premier Gaelic football knock-out competition. Cavan won their first title. Were also the first county from the province of Ulster to win. They ended Kerry's 4 year period in the All Ireland semi-final as All Ireland champions.

Results

Connacht Senior Football Championship

Leinster Senior Football Championship

Munster Senior Football Championship

Ulster Senior Football Championship

All-Ireland Senior Football Championship

Championship statistics

Miscellaneous

 Mullingar's Grounds becomes known as Cusack Park, in Mullingar after Michael Cusack.
Kerry are denied a five-in-a-row by losing the All-Ireland semi-final to Cavan; they would later be denied a five-in-a-row after losing the 1982 final.
 Cavan becomes the first Ulster team to win the All Ireland title.

References

All-Ireland Senior Football Championship